Churayevo (Suray) is a rural locality (a village) in Meneuztamaksky Selsoviet, Miyakinsky District, Bashkortostan, Russia. The population was 130 as of 2010. There are 3 streets.

Geography 
Churayevo is located 26 km northwest of Kirgiz-Miyaki (the district's administrative centre) by road. Meneuztamak is the nearest rural locality.

References 

Rural localities in Miyakinsky District